The following highways are numbered 538:

United States